Dingleden may refer to:

Dingleden, Kent, in the parish of Benenden, England
John Dingleden, MP